José Ruiz  (born 1904, date of death unknown) was a Mexican football forward who made two appearances for Mexico at the 1930 FIFA World Cup.

References

External links

Mexican footballers
Mexico international footballers
1904 births
1962 deaths
1930 FIFA World Cup players
Association football forwards